The Company of Snakes were an English rock band formed in 1998, by former members of the English rock band Whitesnake who were also members of The Snakes. They released two albums before morphing into M3 during 2004.

History 
The Company of Snakes was formed by former Whitesnake guitarists Bernie Marsden and Micky Moody after the demise of its predecessor The Snakes. The band was completed by Black Sabbath and Whitesnake bassist Neil Murray, drummer John Lingwood from MMEB and vocalist Robert Hart from Bad Company and later British singer Gary Barden. After adding keyboardist Don Airey from Rainbow, the band went on tour, playing concerts almost completely consisting of old Whitesnake songs. Singer Barden left the band soon afterwards and was replaced by Swedish vocalist and Snakes in Paradise frontman Stefan Berggren. They toured throughout their history and released the live album Here They Go Again: the show was still sung by Barden, but his lead vocals were deleted and replaced in the studio by Berggren (2001). They were joined in Germany, during their promotional tour for this album by Humble Pie, re-formed by Jerry Shirley and promoting tracks from their album Back on Track. The band recorded one studio album Burst The Bubble(2002) which was recorded after Don Airey had left the band. Berggren left soon after Airey's departure and the remaining band members morphed into M3. After that, Micky Moody and Neil Murray went on to form Snakecharmer.

Members
 Bernie Marsden - Lead guitar (1998–2004)
 Micky Moody - Slide & Rhythm guitar (1998–2004)

The Snakes
 Jørn Lande – lead vocals (1998–1999)
 Sid Ringsby – bass (1998–1999)
 Willy Bendiksen – drums (1998–1999)
 Don Airey - Keyboards (1998-1999)

The Company of Snakes
 Neil Murray - Bass guitar (1999-2002)
 John Lingwood - Drums (1999-2002)
 Don Airey - Keyboards (1999-2002)
 Ian Paice - Drums (2000)
 Jon Lord - Keyboards (2000)
Robert Hart - Vocals (2000)
 Gary Barden - Vocals
 Stefan Berggren - Vocals (2000-2002)

M3
 Neil Murray - Bass guitar (2003-2004)
 Jimmy Copley - Drums (2003-2004)
 Mark Stanway - Keyboards (2003-2004)
 Stefan Berggren - Vocals (2004)
 Doogie White - Vocals (2004)
 Tony Martin -  Vocals (2003-2004)

Discography

References 

English blues rock musical groups
English hard rock musical groups
Rock music supergroups